Francisco José Crespos de Escobar (1620–1674) was a Roman Catholic prelate who served as Bishop of Agrigento (1672–1674).

Biography
Francisco José Crespos de Escobar was born in Medina del Campo, Spain.
On 2 May 1672, he was appointed during the papacy of Pope Clement X as Bishop of Agrigento.
He served as Bishop of Agrigento until his death on 17 May 1674.

References

External links and additional sources
 (for Chronology of Bishops)
 (for Chronology of Bishops) 

17th-century Roman Catholic bishops in Sicily
Bishops appointed by Pope Clement X
1620 births
1674 deaths